Sanjh Aur Savera is a 1964 Bollywood romantic drama film starring Guru Dutt, Meena Kumari and  Mehmood. It was produced by Sevantilal Shah and directed by Hrishikesh Mukherjee. Music of the film was by Shankar Jaikishan. This marked the final film appearance of Guru Dutt who died later in the year of the film's release.

Plot
Dr. Shankar Chaudhry, a wealthy doctor who resides in Bombay with his younger sister, Manju, and his widowed mother, Rukmimi, finds that his mother has arranged a marriage for him with advocate Madhusudan's daughter, Maya. He concedes to the marriage, even though neither he nor his mother have met her.  During the ceremony, Maya faints and recuperates under the care of her cousin, brother Prakash, and Madhusudan, and then the following day accompanies Shankar to his home. Maya rejects Shankar's sexual advances, as she is participating in a Holy Fast.

On a visit to Banaras, where Madhusudan now resides, Shankar remarries Maya at Bhagwan Vishwanath's Temple. Their relationship becomes intimate and she becomes pregnant.

Shankar arrives home one day and discovers that Prakash and Maya are missing; his search for them proves fruitless. He later learns that his wife is an imposter and that she is probably married to Prakash.

Cast

Meena Kumari as	Gauri
Guru Dutt as Dr. Shankar Chaudhry
Mehmood as Prakash
Shubha Khote as Radha (as Subha Khote)
Manmohan Krishna 		
Padmadevi(as Padma Devi)
Jagdev 		
Harindranath Chattopadhyay as Mama, Radha's uncle
Brahm Bhardwaj 	
Kanu Roy 	
Rashid Khan 	as music shop owner		
Preeti Bala 			
Praveen Paul as Manorama - Radha's mom (as Ruby Paul)
Zeb Rehman as Maya

Soundtrack

"Ajhun Na Aye Balamwa Revival": Mohammed Rafi, Suman Kalyanpur 
"Ajhun Na Aye Balamwa": Mohammed Rafi, Suman Kalyanpur 
"Chand Kanwal Mere Chand Kanwal": Suman Kalyanpur
"Man Mohan Krishna Murari": Lata Mangeshkar
"O Sajna Mere Ghar Angna": Lata Mangeshkar
"Taqdeer Kahan Le Jayegi Malum Nahin": Mohammed Rafi 	
"Yehi Hai Woh Sanjh Aur Savera": Mohammed Rafi, Asha Bhosle	
"Zindagi Mujhko Dikha De Rasta": Mohammed Rafi

References

External links
 

1960s Hindi-language films
1964 films
Indian pregnancy films
Indian romantic drama films
1964 romantic drama films
Films directed by Hrishikesh Mukherjee
Films scored by Shankar–Jaikishan